Emiler Goenda Bahini is a 1980 Bangladeshi feature film directed by Badal Rahman. It is based on German writer Erich Kästner's 1929 novel Emil and the Detectives. The film won Bangladesh National Film Awards in 5 categories including Best Film, Best Supporting Actor, Best Child Artist, Best Cinematographer (Color) and Best Editing.

Cast
 Partho Shahid as Emil
 Golam Mustafa
 ATM Shamsuzzaman
 Sharmili Ahmed
 Ataur Rahman
 Dr. Enamul Haque
 Sara Zaker
 Anisur Rahman Anis
 Syed Lutfur Rahman

Accolades
Bangladesh National Film Awards
 Bangladesh National Film Award for Best Film
 Bangladesh National Film Award for Best Supporting Actor
 Bangladesh National Film Award for Best Child Artist
 Bangladesh National Film Award for Best Cinematographer (Color)
 Bangladesh National Film Award for Best Editor

References

External links
 

Best Film National Film Award (Bangladesh) winners
1980 films
Bengali-language Bangladeshi films
Films based on works by Erich Kästner
Bangladeshi remakes of foreign films
Films scored by Alam Khan
1980s Bengali-language films
Films based on German novels
Bangladesh Film Development Corporation films
Government of Bangladesh grants films
Films directed by Badal Rahman